Peters Park was a planned but never realized neighborhood in Atlanta, Georgia, located on the site of today's Georgia Tech campus. Had the neighborhood actually been established in 1884-5, Peters Park would have been Atlanta's first garden suburb, preceding Inman Park, the first to feature winding roads, a lake and a planted boulevard.

Organizers
The land was owned by Atlanta founder and railroad man Richard Peters, and the "model suburban town", as it was called then, was planned by Hannibal Kimball, who was behind the once-iconic Kimball House hotel and the 1881 International Cotton Exposition. Nathan Franklin Barrett was the nationally renowned landscape architect.

Planned features
Peters Park would be accessible via the Peachtree or Marietta Street horsecar lines of the Atlanta Street Railway Company. Lots were improved by the land development company, a novelty for Atlanta at the time. By May 1885, $50,000 had been spent improving the neighborhood in anticipation of lot sales.

Failure
The project failed — few lots were sold. Reasons attributed were the walking distance from the horsecar lines, high prices, and the onerous restrictions as to what could be built on the lots.

Destination of land
In 1887 Peters offered to donate  fronting on North Avenue and Cherry Street as the site of the Technological School, which would become Georgia Tech, as an alternative to Boulevard and Grant Park, the two other sites being considered for the school. The offer was accepted, and Peters was able to sell an additional adjacent  of prime land for use by the school. The remainder of the Peters Park land would become the Hemphill Avenue neighborhood, which would be razed in the late 1960s and become part of the Georgia Tech campus.

See also
 History of Georgia Tech

References

Further reading
 "Peters Park", Atlanta Constitution, March 30, 1884, p. 1
 Atlanta History Forum

Former neighborhoods of Atlanta
Georgia Tech